The Crooked Creek Range is a mountain range in Malheur County, Oregon, United States.

References 

Mountain ranges of Oregon
Mountain ranges of Malheur County, Oregon